Louhivuori is a Finnish surname. Notable people with the surname include:

Olavi Louhivuori (born 1981), Finnish jazz drummer and composer
Oskari Wilho Louhivuori (1884–1953), Finnish politician

Finnish-language surnames